Victim of Circumstance may refer to:
 A single by Joan Jett & the Blackhearts from their I Love Rock 'n' Roll album.
 An album by Public Disturbance, a Welsh hard-core punk band.